The Kansas City Greyhounds were a professional ice hockey team. Based in Kansas City, Missouri, they operated within the American Hockey Association (AHA) under various names from 1927 to 1942.

The franchise was a reiteration of the Chicago Cardinals, which played in the AHA in the 1926–27 season. After a dispute between the owner of the Cardinals and the National Hockey League (NHL), the Cardinals folded.

The NHL's Chicago Black Hawks owned the contracts of a number of the Cardinal players, and started a new AHA franchise in Kansas City. The Kansas City Pla-Mors operated from 1927 to 1933, changed its name to the Greyhoundsits longest used namefrom 1933 to 1940, then was renamed the Kansas City Americans from 1940 to 1942, after which the team folded.

Notable players

Heads coaches 
 Magnus Goodman
 Helge Bostrom
 Melville Keeling

Players 
 Melville Keeling
 Eddie Bush
 Art Wiebe
 Nick Wasnie
 Ralph Taylor

References
Kansas City Greyhounds profile at The Internet Hockey Database

1933 establishments in Missouri
1940 disestablishments in Missouri
American Hockey Association (1926–1942) teams
Defunct ice hockey teams in the United States
Professional ice hockey teams in Missouri
Ice hockey clubs established in 1933
Ice hockey clubs disestablished in 1940